Harrison Pennoh is best known for allegedly killing then President of Liberia, William Tolbert, on 12 April 1980.

1980 coup d'état 

In 1979, hundreds of protesters marched through the streets of Liberia's capital, Monrovia, demonstrating against the sharp rise in the price of rice. Tolbert ordered his troops to fire on the demonstrators, and some seventy people were killed. Despite efforts to restore order, rioting ensued throughout Liberia, and attempts to quash the opposition by arresting its leaders failed. On 12 April 1980, Tolbert was overthrown by military mutineers in a coup d'état where the 66-year-old President was savagely murdered by private soldier Harrison Pennoh, who later proved mentally unstable. Before the end of the month Tolbert's entire Cabinet had been put on trial and sentenced to death - with no right to be defended by a lawyer and no right to appeal to the verdict. In a horrific scene they were all but one publicly executed on a beach near Monrovia. The only cabinet member who escaped from being shot was the only minister of tribal origin, raised in an Americo-Liberian family that was part of the Tolbert-clan.

External links
Liberia Past and Present mentioning the killing of Tolbert by Pennoh. 

1980 murders in Africa
Assassins of presidents
Liberian rebels
20th-century Liberian people
Year of birth missing
Murder in Liberia